The Vasilat is a left tributary of the river Lotru in Romania. It discharges into the Lotru in Valea lui Stan near Brezoi.

Tributaries

The following rivers are tributaries to the river Vasilat (from source to mouth):

Left: Pârâul cu Lespezi, Valea Socilor, Valea Cârpătoare, Valea Boului, Șchioapa, Glodu, Valea Greșurilor
Right: Izvorul Frumos, Ciortea, Valea Largă, Valea Cocinilor, Secăreaua

References

Rivers of Romania
Rivers of Vâlcea County